HMDI may refer to:

 Hydrogenated MDI or 4,4′-diisocyanato dicyclohexylmethane, usually abbreviated as H12MDI 
 Hexamethylene diisocyanate, usually abbreviated as HDI